Forget (stylised as FORGET) is the tenth studio album by experimental band Xiu Xiu, released on February 24, 2017. Produced by John Congleton, Greg Saunier, and Angela Seo, it features contributions from Charlemagne Palestine, Kristof Hahn, Vaginal Davis, and Enyce Smith.

Background 
The album cover bears Arabic calligraphy that translates to "we forget". Xiu Xiu leader Jamie Stewart has stated that the album cover has no meaning besides that "it looks beautiful" and is not meant as a political statement: "in hoping to depoliticize it, I suppose that it becomes political." "Petite" and "Faith, Torn Apart" are about women used in sex trafficking on Backpage.

The title was further explained by Stewart: “To forget uncontrollably embraces the duality of human frailty. It is a rebirth in blanked out renewal but it also drowns and mutilates our attempt to hold on to what is dear.”

In a press release, the album was marketed as the band's "most direct engagement with pop music"

Critical reception

At Metacritic, which assigns a weighted average score out of 100 to reviews from mainstream critics, the album received an average score of 77% based on 9 reviews, indicating "generally favorable reviews".

Andrew Paschal of PopMatters gave the album 8 stars out of 10, calling it "one of Xiu Xiu's poppiest and most accessible works to date".

Track listing

Personnel
Xiu Xiu
 Jamie Stewart – vocals, guitar, modular synthesizer, organ, programming
 Angela Seo – synthesizer, organ, percussion

Additional personnel
 Vaginal Davis – vocals
 Kristof Hahn – guitar
 Tanisha Hall – vocals
 Devin Hoff – double bass
 Chiara Lee – vocals
 Charlemagne Palestine – carillon
 Greg Saunier – bass guitar, percussion, guitar, synthesizer, vocals, organ
 Enyce Smith – commentary
 Federico Zanatta – vocals

Charts

References

External links
 

2017 albums
Xiu Xiu albums
Polyvinyl Record Co. albums
Albums produced by John Congleton